Madi may refer to:

Places 
 Madi, Chitwan, a municipality in Chitwan District in Nepal
 Madi Municipality, Sankhuwasabha, a municipality in Sankhuwasabha District in Nepal
 Madi Rural  Municipality, Rolpa, a rural municipality in Rolpa District in Nepal
 Madi Rural  Municipality, Kaski, a rural municipality in Kaski District in Nepal
 Madi, Estonia, a village in Estonia
 Madi Khola, a tributary of the West Rapti River, Nepal
 Madi River, a tributary of the Gandaki River, Nepal
 Madi (canal), old canals in Isfahan, diverted from the Zayande River

People and characters
 Madi people of South Sudan and Uganda
 Madi, the central character in Gardening for Kids with Madi

Other uses 
 MADI, a digital audio interface
 Madí, an international abstract art movement, begun in Argentina ("Movimiento Abstracción Dimensión Invención")
 Madi language (disambiguation)
 Moscow Automobile and Road Construction State Technical University, shortened as MADI, a technical university in Moscow

See also 

 
 Mahdi (disambiguation)
 Madhi (disambiguation)
 Maddi (disambiguation)
 Maddy (disambiguation) including Maddie
 Mady

 Madie (disambiguation)

Language and nationality disambiguation pages